The All-Ireland Senior Hurling Championship 1921 was the 35th series of the All-Ireland Senior Hurling Championship, Ireland's premier hurling knock-out competition.  Limerick won the championship, beating Dublin 8-5 to 3-2 in the final.

Format

All-Ireland Championship

Semi-final: (1 match) This was a lone match which saw the winners of the Munster championship play Galway who received a bye to this stage. One team was eliminated at this stage while the winning team advanced to the final.

Final: (1 match) The winners of the lone semi-final played the winners of the Leinster championship.  The winners were declared All-Ireland champions.

Results

Leinster Senior Hurling Championship

Munster Senior Hurling Championship

All-Ireland Senior Hurling Championship

References

Sources

 Corry, Eoghan, The GAA Book of Lists (Hodder Headline Ireland, 2005).
 Donegan, Des, The Complete Handbook of Gaelic Games (DBA Publications Limited, 2005).

1921